Clavulina floridana is a species of fungus in the family Clavulinaceae. It was originally described by Rolf Singer as Clavaria floridana in 1945, then E.J.H. Corner transferred it to Clavulina in 1950.

References

External links

Fungi described in 1945
Fungi of North America
floridana
Taxa named by Rolf Singer